The Miss New York World competition is a beauty pageant that selects the representative for New York State in the Miss World America pageant.

The current Miss New York World is Alissa Anderegg of New York City. On October 16, 2020, Anderegg was crowned Miss World America 2020.

Winners 
Color key

Notes to table

References

External links

New York (state) culture
 
New York (state)